Laurel House station, branch MP 18.5, was built as part of the three-foot gauge Kaaterskill Railroad, an extension of the Stony Clove and Catskill Mountain Railroad. It was built so passengers could stop there and take a horse and carriage to the Laurel House, a hotel that was nearby. When it was built, it was anything but an actual station; in fact, it was nothing but a platform. When the Ulster and Delaware standard-gauged the railroad in 1899, it was replaced with an actual station. The branch it served would become an actual part of the railroad in 1903.

It was square shaped, and like most other stations on the U&D, had a built-in gutter. It was well operated until the late 1930s. That's when it became nothing but a flagstop, where one would have to wave a tin flag to get a train to stop. It was abandoned when the Kaaterskill branch was abandoned in 1939, and eventually scrapped in 1940, along with the Stony Clove Branch, and the Hunter Branch. The New York State Government decided to get rid of the station, and eventually burnt it to the ground.

Bibliography

References

External links
Ulster and Delaware Railroad Historical Society map

Railway stations in the Catskill Mountains
Former Ulster and Delaware Railroad stations
Railway stations closed in 1940
Railway stations in Greene County, New York
Former railway stations in New York (state)
Railway stations in the United States opened in 1883